Michele Chiaruzzi (born September 12, 1983, in City of San Marino, San Marino) is the current ambassador of San Marino to Bosnia and Herzegovina. He was the first sammarinese ambassador to Bosnia and Herzegovina at unusually young age and supposedly the youngest European resident ambassador at the time, having presented his credential letters in 2008 to the President Haris Silajdžić.

He has been a taekwondo fighter at the St. Petersburg Student World Championships and he holds a PhD in history from the Scuola Superiore di Studi Storici di San Marino. Before his diplomatic role, he has been a visiting fellow with the Centre for International Studies at the London School of Economics and Political Science, and the Watson Institute for International and Public Affairs at Brown University while ambassador Richard Holbrooke was serving as professor at large. A Clare Hall Life Member at Cambridge, and Professor at Bologna, he is the founding director of the Research Centre for International Relations at the University of San Marino. He has been described as "one of the few people in the microstate who might qualify for the designation ‘public intellectual’". His book Martin Wight on Fortune and Irony in Politics included the unpublished ‘Fortune’s Banter’, a text subsequently reproduced without «Professor Chiaruzzi’s extensive and impressive scholarly annotations» in the Oxford University Press collection of Wight's miscellaneous works. His unusual diplomatic figure has attracted international media attention.  
He has been one of the protagonists in Goran Milic's documentary for Al Jazeera "Alkemija Balkana". On 14 July 2010, on his initiative the local government of Chiesanuova placed a monumental plaque in memory of the Srebrenica genocide. It is one of the first public monuments in Europe dedicated to those events. That year he has been honoured at the Ambassador's Alley in Sarajevo. Promoting dialogue among civilizations, in 2019 he has realized the 'Chapel of three religions', the first ever monument of its kind devoted to interfaith dialogue. The embassy of San Marino in Sarajevo is located in the building created by the Austro-Hungarian historian Hamdija Kreševljaković to whom is dedicated the homonym residential street.

References

Living people
Ambassadors of San Marino to Bosnia and Herzegovina
1983 births
Sammarinese political scientists
Sammarinese historians